OC Oerlikon is a listed technology group headquartered in Pfäffikon (Schwyz), Switzerland. The name "Oerlikon" (or "œrlikon", as the company styles itself according to its corporate identity) comes from the Oerlikon district in Zurich where the group has its origins.

Following an extensive restructuring process, the holding was renamed Unaxis at the start of 2000. The Austrian Victory Industriebeteiligung AG acquired a majority share in Unaxis in 2005. New management initiated a restructuring effort that manifested itself in a new name – OC Oerlikon – from the beginning of September 2005. At the end of 2006, the Saurer Group was acquired and integrated into OC Oerlikon. As of today, a position of around 41% is held by Liwet Holding AG, of which Victor Vekselberg is one of the beneficial owners.

Corporate affairs

Corporate structure 

OC Oerlikon currently has two Divisions:
 Surface Solutions Division (Oerlikon Balzers, Oerlikon Metco and Oerlikon AM)
 Polymer Processing Division (Oerlikon Barmag, Oerlikon Neumag and Oerlikon Nonwoven)

The following divisions of the Oerlikon Components business unit, which were designated as not in line with the company's core business, were divested in 2009: Oerlikon Esec (semiconductors) was sold in April 2009 to the Dutch company BE Semiconductor Industries (Besi), and Oerlikon Space (aerospace engineering) was sold off in June 2009 to RUAG Holding. The last remaining company in the Oerlikon Optics business unit (optics) – Oerlikon Optics Shanghai – was sold off in mid-August 2009 to the British company EIS Optics, which had been newly set up by the London-based private equity firms Nova Capital Management Limited and FF&P Private Equity Limited. Since that time, Oerlikon Components has operated as the Advanced Technologies Segment.

On March 2, 2012, Oerlikon signed a contract of sale with Tokyo Electron for its solar division, Oerlikon Solar, which employed 675 people at eight locations around the world, including its headquarters in Trübbach, Switzerland, near the border to Liechtenstein. Tokyo Electron Limited is one of the world's leading suppliers of semiconductor production equipment and is active in R&D, manufacturing and sales in a wide range of product fields. The sale of Oerlikon Solar was finalized on November 27, 2012.

On December 3, 2012, Oerlikon announced that it was selling two business units from its Textile Segment – Natural Fibers and Textile Components – to the Chinese Jinsheng Group, to allow the Textile Segment to focus on its manmade fibers business. The sale of the Natural Fibers business unit was finalized on July 4, 2013.

On June 2, 2014, Oerlikon acquired Metco from Sulzer AG, integrating it into its existing Coating Segment to create a global provider of surface solutions in the form of the Surface Solutions Segment, currently the company's largest Segment.

On December 23, 2014, Oerlikon announced that it had reached an agreement on the sale of its Advanced Technologies Segment to the Swiss company Evatec AG. This sale was closed ahead of schedule and the Segment's 200 employees and all of its assets were successfully transferred to Evatec on February 3, 2015.

In July 2016 Oerlikon announced that all approvals for a strategic divestment of Oerlikon's Vacuum business to Atlas Copco have been received. The transaction was successfully closed on August 31, 2016.

In November 2016, Oerlikon announced that they will be building a new manufacturing facility in Plymouth Township, Michigan. This facility will be used to produce materials for additive manufacturing and surface coatings. There will also be a research & development (R&D) lab for further developments of titanium and other alloys at this facility.

In July 2018, Oerlikon announced that it had signed a definite agreement for the sale of its Drive Systems Segment to Dana Inc. The transaction was closed on February 28, 2019.

Ownership structure 

The ownership structure of OC Oerlikon has gone through numerous drastic changes over the years, partly due to some large options transactions. When the company was recapitalized, its shareholder structure changed once again. Oerlikon's Annual Report 2021 gives the shareholder structure as follows:

Board of directors 

The board of directors is responsible for the supervision and strategic management of the company. At Oerlikon's 42nd Annual General Meeting of Shareholders, Prof. Dr. Michael Süss was appointed chairman of the board of directors. The current members of the Board of Directors of OC Oerlikon Corporation AG, Pfäffikon, are:

 Prof. Dr. Michael Süss, Executive Chairman 
 Gerhard Pegam, Member and Vice Chairman of the Board of Directors
 Irina Matveeva, Member of the Board of Directors
 Alexey Moskov, Member of the Board of Directors
 Geoffery Merszei, Member of the Board of Directors
 Zhenguo Yao, Member of the Board of Directors 
 Paul Adams, Member of the Board of Directors
Although Prof. Dr. Michael Süss, Alexey Moskov and Irina Matveeva represent the interests of Liwet AG, all seven members of the Board of Directors are independent as defined by the Swiss Code of Best Practice for Corporate Governance.

Executive committee 

In May 2004, Thomas Limberger was appointed to the board of directors; in June 2005, at the request of the majority shareholder, Victory Industriebeteiligung, he was named CEO of Unaxis as the company was known at the time. Under Limberger, two further roles were added to the executive committee in February 2007: General Counsel (filled by Bjoern Bajan), and COO (Uwe Krüger). Limberger stayed with the company until May 2007, when he resigned as CEO and from the board of directors and joined Von Roll Holding.

Upon his resignation, Limberger was replaced as CEO by Uwe Krüger, whose previous position as COO remained vacant until September 2008, when it was filled by Thomas Babacan. At the presentation of the interim financial results on August 25, 2009, it was announced that Uwe Krüger would be leaving the company with immediate effect. The position of CEO was temporarily filled by Hans Ziegler, who had been a member of the Board of Directors since May 2008.

On May 19, 2010, Michael Buscher assumed the role of CEO, relieving Hans Ziegler as interim CEO. Adrian Cojocaru was appointed Chief HR Officer in November 2010. The position of Chief Restructuring Officer, which had been created during the restructuring process and was occupied by Raafat Morcos, was abolished again following the end of the restructuring program on August 17, 2011. The post of Chief Operating Officer that had been left vacant following the departure of Thomas Babacan on December 31, 2011, was not occupied again. The Chief HR Officer, Adrian Cojocaru, left the company at the end of 2012.
CEO Michael Buscher left the company on March 14, 2013. He was replaced as CEO on an interim basis by CFO Jürg Fedier, who at that time was the only member of the executive committee.
Brice Koch took up the position of CEO of OC Oerlikon in January 2014, allowing Jürg Fedier to focus on his original role as CFO.

In March 2016, Oerlikon announced former Siemens AG manager Roland Fischer would replace Brice Koch as CEO.

With the publication of the 2021 annual results on March 1, 2022, OC Oerlikon announced that Roland Fischer was stepping down as CEO for private reasons, and that Michael Süss will assume the executive chair role. Since July 1, 2022, Michael Süß is  executive chairman of OC Oerlikon, overseeing all group-level management topics and leading the executive committee in addition to his role as chairman of Oerlikon's board of directors.

The current members of the executive committee of OC Oerlikon are:

 Prof. Dr. Michael Süss, Executive Chairman 
 Philipp Müller, CFO
 Anna Ryzhova, Chief Human Resources Officer
Dr. Markus Tacke, CEO Surface Solutions Division
Georg Stausberg, CEO Polymer Processing Division

History

Oerlikon-Bührle 

The foundations for OC Oerlikon were laid when Oerlikon-Bührle Holding AG was established in 1973. At its peak in 1980, the holding company had 37,000 employees. At the start of the 1980s, the group already had an aerospace division (set up in 1964 as part of Contraves AG) and a thin-film/vacuum technology division, which it had had since 1976 when the company took over Balzers AG. Due to poor performance, in 1991 the group was forced to concentrate on certain divisions only. The decision was taken to restructure the company and focus exclusively on technology. This narrowing of the company's focus was driven by the 1994 takeover of the Leybold Group, a specialist in vacuum technology, which was merged with Balzers to form Balzers & Leybold, a leading company in thin-film technology, which would later become Oerlikon-Bührle's core business.

The biggest turning point for the company came in 1999 with the sale of various core businesses and virtually all interests in other companies that no longer fitted Oerlikon's new business concept. The company sold its arms division, Oerlikon Contraves Defence, to the German Rheinmetall DeTec, where it now operates under the new name of Rheinmetall Air Defence AG. Oerlikon-Bührle Immobilien AG was sold to Allreal Holding where it acquired its present name of Allreal Generalunternehmung AG. The shoe and accessories manufacturer Bally was sold to the US-based Texas Pacific Group. Oerlikon-Bührle was renamed Unaxis in January 2000.

Unaxis 

In mid-2000, Unaxis acquired a majority share in the semiconductor manufacturer Esec AG. Toward the end of that year, it sold Pilatus Flugzeugwerke AG – the last company that did not fit in with the rest of Unaxis' technology portfolio. In December 2001, Unaxis spun off Leybold Optics once again, but retained the vacuum technology division.

At the beginning of 2004, Unaxis was restructured into five Segments: Semiconductor Equipment, Data Storage Solutions, Coating Services, Vacuum Solutions and Components and Special Systems. A merger in March 2004 placed Esec entirely under the ownership of Unaxis. Poor performance in FY 2004 from the semiconductor division of Esec meant losses of CHF 372 million for Unaxis and a slump in its share price. The Esec business unit was eventually sold again in April 2009.

In June 2005, Unaxis' new majority shareholder, the Austrian firm Victory Industriebeteiligung AG, called an extraordinary general meeting where it replaced virtually all of the group's management team. This also saw Thomas Limberger appointed as the new Unaxis CEO. The new management team succeeded in reducing losses massively in 2005, and expressed a desire to abandon the abstract company name "Unaxis" and bring back a well-established company name from the past.

In 2006, the Russian oligarch Viktor Vekselberg acquired a substantial share in the company. At the annual general meeting in May 2006, a suggestion that "Oerlikon" – the name of the village where Werkzeugmaschinenfabrik Oerlikon was founded – be used as part of the company's name was approved. Rheinmetall reacted strongly against the use of the abbreviation OC because of the potential confusion with its subsidiary Oerlikon Contraves, whose abbreviation is also OC. Unaxis was renamed Oerlikon – formally OC Oerlikon Corporation AG – with effect from the beginning of September 2006.

Naming disputes 

The renaming of Unaxis was delayed due to various objections from Rheinmetall and its subsidiaries. When Oerlikon Contraves was sold in 1999, the then Oerlikon-Bührle secured the right to continue using the protected name Contraves (as in Contraves Space). Nothing was agreed regarding "Oerlikon", however, since it is the name of an actual location – Oerlikon was a village that became a district of Zurich in 1934 – and so appears in the names of several dozen companies. For these reasons, for legal purposes the company "Oerlikon" officially refers to itself as OC Oerlikon Corporation, and has only trademarked the new Oerlikon wordmark and logo. At the beginning of September 2006, the media started referring to the company primarily as "Unaxis-Oerlikon". OC Oerlikon Corporation AG was successfully entered in the commercial register in March 2006 (before the company had started operating under that name) and the renaming of Unaxis Management AG to OC Oerlikon Management AG was entered in the commercial register in May 2006.

All disputes regarding company names were settled in the third quarter of 2006, and in September 2006, Unaxis Holding AG was officially renamed OC Oerlikon Corporation AG. In December of that year, Unaxis Schweiz AG (formerly Esec SA) was renamed Oerlikon Assembly Equipment AG.

Takeover of Saurer 

The investment firm Laxey attempted to replace the management of the textile machine manufacturer Saurer AG at an extraordinary general meeting, but the attempt was thwarted at an early stage. This was due to negative reporting in the media and the subsequent surprise intervention of Victory Industriebeteiligung and OC Oerlikon, at that time only a few days old. Oerlikon acquired Laxey's entire share package. With Oerlikon now holding a majority share in Saurer, the obligatory takeover bid was made to the remaining Saurer shareholders.

Restructuring and recapitalization 

In 2008 and 2009, the group suffered the full force of the recession that followed in the wake of the global financial and economic crisis. Demand and sales dropped substantially, particularly in the Textile Segment, but also in the company's other Segments. Hans Ziegler was appointed as interim CEO to undertake a major restructuring of the group. According to Oerlikon's Annual Report 2009, more than 2 500 employees were laid off in 2009, and the workforce declined by a further 1 100 as a result of companies being sold off. A comprehensive restructuring of the group's finances was also necessary. Following lengthy negotiations, an agreement was reached with Oerlikon's main shareholder, Renova, and the lending banks, which was approved by the company's shareholders at the annual general meeting on May 18, 2010.

The key points of the recapitalization were a reduction in equity capital through a par value reduction from CHF 20 to CHF 1, followed by a capital increase with a subscription right offer and the issue of options for shareholders. CHF 125 million of the company's debts were erased and an old credit facility was replaced with a new contract for three tranches totaling CHF 1.48 billion. The recapitalization resulted in a reduction in debt of CHF 998 million and liquid assets of CHF 276 million for the group.

Transformation of company through acquisitions and divestments 

On November 22, 2011, the group reorganized its largest and most important Segment, the Textile Segment, combining the existing five business units into three: Manmade Fibers (formerly Oerlikon Barmag and Oerlikon Neumag), Natural Fibers (formerly Oerlikon Schlafhorst and Oerlikon Saurer) and Textile Components (formerly Oerlikon Textile Components).

In the course of this reorganization process, the Segment's upper management was gradually relocated to Shanghai, and hence to the world's largest textile market. The new CEO of the Segment, Clement Woon, is from Singapore.

On December 3, 2012, Oerlikon announced that it was selling two business units from its Textile Segment – Natural Fibers and Textile Components – to the Chinese Jinsheng Group. The sale of the Natural Fibers business unit was finalized on July 4, 2013. Within textile machinery construction, the group plans to concentrate in the future on production machinery for manmade fibers.
At the beginning of 2014, OC Oerlikon acquired Sulzer Metco from Sulzer AG.

On November 20, 2015, Oerlikon announced its intention to sell its Vacuum Segment to Atlas Copco. The transaction was closed on August 31, 2016.

In July 2018, Oerlikon announced that it was selling its Drive Systems Segment to Dana Inc. The sale was finalized on February 28, 2019.

External links
 Official website
 Immer wieder neu erfunden. In: NZZ am Sonntag, June 18, 2012

References

 
Technology companies established in 1973
Textile machinery manufacturers
Manufacturing companies of Switzerland
Equipment semiconductor companies
Manufacturers of industrial automation
Companies listed on the SIX Swiss Exchange
Swiss brands
Renova Group
Swiss companies established in 1973